Our Lady of Mount Carmel Church is a Roman Catholic parish church in Redditch, Worcestershire, England. It was built from 1833 to 1834 and designed by Thomas Rickman in the Gothic Revival style. It is located between Beoley Road West and Holloway Lane in the town centre. It is a Grade II listed building.

History

Construction
After the Reformation a Catholic mission was maintained around Redditch. At first the mission was in Beoley and supported by the Sheldon family. From 1783, the mission was at Chapel Farm in Heath Green. The current church's site was bought by a local noblewoman, the Lady Catherine Smythe. On 11 February 1833, the foundation stone was laid. The local priest, Fr Bruno Tunstall contributed to the building costs. The church is only the Catholic Church designed by Thomas Rickman. On 24 April 1834, the church was opened. In 1872, the church was restored. The work was done by Hardman & Co.

Developments
Initially, the parish was served by Benedictine priests from Downside Abbey. From 1948, the parish was transferred to the care of priests from Belmont Abbey, Herefordshire. They served the church until 1968, when the parish was handed over to the Archdiocese of Birmingham who continue to serve the congregation.

Parish
Our Lady of Mount Carmel Church is its own parish. It has three Sunday Masses at 5:00pm on Saturday and at 8:15am and 6:00pm on Sunday.

Exterior

See also
List of new churches by Thomas Rickman

References

External links
 

Redditch
Roman Catholic churches in Worcestershire
Grade II listed churches in Worcestershire
Grade II listed Roman Catholic churches in England
Gothic Revival church buildings in England
Gothic Revival architecture in Worcestershire
19th-century Roman Catholic church buildings in the United Kingdom
1833 establishments in England
Roman Catholic churches completed in 1834
Religious organizations established in 1833
Thomas Rickman buildings